Prince Olav or Prins Olav may refer to
People
Prince Olav of Norway (1903-91), the future King Olav V held this title between 1905 and 1957.

Places
Prince Olav Coast, part of Queen Maud Land, Antarctica
Prince Olav Mountains, Queen Maud Land, Antarctica

Ships
, a Norwegian passenger ship in service 1925-40